The Marks Group is a Maryland-based operator of radio and television stations in small markets in the United States. Founded by Stephen A. Marks (1950–2022), the company holds 14 radio stations and five television properties.

History
Marks entered the broadcast ownership business in 1983 when he acquired 51 percent of Thunder Bay Broadcasting, which owned WBKB-TV, the only television station in Alpena, Michigan. Marks, a native of Maryland, had previously worked as a copywriter at WINX in Rockville, Maryland, before being employed by the Mutual Broadcasting System.

Marks acquired KXGN radio and television in Glendive, Montana, in 1990. KXGN-TV, like WBKB-TV in Alpena, was the only TV station in its town, a fact Marks liked as it could then command all television advertising revenue in the market. This transaction, as well as the purchase of Glendive FM station KDZN in 1995, required waivers on account of the financial condition of the small-market stations. Further Montana broadcast properties were added with the 1995 purchase of KYUS-TV in Miles City and the 1996 acquisition of KIKC-AM-FM in Forsyth.

In 2003 Marks acquired WBKP and WBUP, together serving the Marquette, Michigan, television market. Added in 2015 were four stations owned by Heartland Communications in Iron River, Michigan, and Park Falls, Wisconsin.

Stephen Marks died on May 11, 2022, at the age of 72.

Stations

Television

 KXGN-TV channel 5, Glendive, Montana (CBS/MTN/NBC DT2)
 KYUS-TV channel 3, Miles City, Montana (NBC, rebroadcasts Billings' KULR-TV, a station owned by Cowles Company)
 WBKB-TV channel 11, Alpena, Michigan (CBS/NBC DT2/ABC DT3/Fox DT4)
 WBKP channel 5, Calumet/Marquette, Michigan (The CW)
 WBUP channel 10, Ishpeming/Marquette, Michigan (ABC)

Radio

Michigan
 WCCY 1400 AM - Houghton, Michigan
 WHKB 102.3 FM - Houghton, Michigan
 WOLV 97.7 FM - Houghton, Michigan
 WFER 1230 AM - Iron River, Michigan
 WIKB-FM 99.1 FM - Iron River, Michigan

Montana
 KDZN 96.5 FM - Glendive, Montana
 KGCX 93.1 FM - Sidney, Montana
 KIKC 1250 AM - Forsyth, Montana
 KIKC-FM 101.3 FM - Forsyth, Montana
 KMTA 1050 AM - Miles City, Montana
 KXGN 1400 AM - Glendive, Montana
 KYUS-FM 92.3 FM - Miles City, Montana

North Dakota
 KDSR 101.1 FM - Williston, North Dakota
 KXDI 93.9 FM - Belfield, North Dakota
 KXWI 98.5 FM - Williston, North Dakota

Virginia
 WOWZ-FM 99.3 FM - Accomac, Virginia (Time brokered to GSB Media)

Wisconsin
 WCQM 98.3 FM - Park Falls, Wisconsin
 WPFP 980 AM - Park Falls, Wisconsin

References 

Radio broadcasting companies of the United States